Kunukkitta Kozhi is a 1992 Indian Malayalam-language comedy-drama film directed by Viji Thampi and written by Kaloor Dennis, starring Jagadeesh, Siddique, Rupini and Parvathy. The songs were composed by Johnson.

Plot

Unnikrishnan is a street-smart jobless youth desperate to get a job. Once in a job interview, Swarnalatha outsmarts him to get the job by telling the manager that she is Unnikrishnan's wife and because of his irresponsible behaviour, they are in dire straits. The manager, who was earlier irritated by Unnikrishnan's interview, out of sympathy offers her the job. Unnikrishnan, meanwhile, learns of this and he demands half of her salary.

Meanwhile, Swarnalatha's close friend Indumathy and her husband Viswanathan are going through a rough patch financially and he is unable to repay the loans which he had taken. Circumstances lead Unnikrishnan to be mistaken for Viswanathan by the grandmother of Indumathy and invites him and her once banished granddaughter, who had eloped with Viswanathan, back to their ancestral home. To avoid traumatising her grandmother, Indumathy and Unnikrishnan act as husband and wife and Swarnalatha also stays with them. The arrival of Viswanathan too on the scene causes chaos and confusion, starting with him assaulting Unnikrishnan.

Cast
Jagadheesh as Unnikrishnan
Siddique as Viswanathan
Rupini as Swarnalatha
Parvathy as Indumathy, Viswanathan's wife
Jagathy Sreekumar as Gurukkal
Philomina as Indumathy's grandmother
K. P. A. C. Sunny as Vakkachan
Sadiq as Henchman
Jagannatha Varma as Chairman of company
Subair as Advocate
Jagannathan as Staff at the office
James as Driver from Bangalore

Soundtrack
"Kunungi Kunungi" - K V Sivaprasad and Latika
"Illakattile" - K J Yesudas

References

External links

1992 films
1990s Malayalam-language films
Films directed by Viji Thampi
Films scored by Johnson